The 1991 Canadian Grand Prix was a Formula One motor race held at Circuit Gilles Villeneuve on 2 June 1991. It was the fifth race of the 1991 FIA Formula One World Championship.

The 69-lap race was won by Nelson Piquet, driving a Benetton-Ford. Piquet took the 23rd and final win of his F1 career after old rival Nigel Mansell, driving a Williams-Renault, suddenly stopped halfway round the last lap while leading by almost a minute. Stefano Modena took second in a Tyrrell-Honda, while Mansell's team-mate Riccardo Patrese was third, having started from pole position. Piquet's win was the first for a car using Pirelli tyres since the 1986 Mexican Grand Prix.

This was the last win for a car using Pirelli tyres until the 2011 Australian Grand Prix.

Pre-race
Between the Monaco and Canadian Grands Prix, Cesare Fiorio had been fired as team manager of Ferrari and had been replaced by Piero Ferrari. Meanwhile, John Barnard had left as Benetton's technical director; he was replaced by Gordon Kimball (father of future IndyCar driver Charlie Kimball). The Circuit Gilles Villeneuve had been modified from the year before: the right-left sequence before the start-finish straight was altered to slow cars down.

On the driver front, Julian Bailey's funding ran out and he was replaced at Lotus by Johnny Herbert, who subsequently failed to qualify for the race, while Alex Caffi was out of action for Footwork as a result of injuries sustained in a road accident. His place was taken by Stefan Johansson.

Qualifying

Pre-qualifying report
As at the previous Grand Prix in Monaco, the pre-qualifying session was dominated by the Scuderia Italia Dallara cars, and the Jordans. With Dallara's Emanuele Pirro fastest ahead of his team-mate JJ Lehto, followed by Jordan's Andrea de Cesaris and Bertrand Gachot, there was over a second between the four pre-qualifiers and the rest.

Those who failed to progress to the main qualifying sessions included Olivier Grouillard, fifth fastest for Fondmetal, his best result of the season so far. The Modena team was starting to run into financial difficulties, and the performance of their Lambo cars was also slipping, as Nicola Larini and Eric van de Poele ended the session down in sixth and seventh positions. Slowest was Pedro Chaves in the Coloni, despite a new Hart-prepared Cosworth DFR engine.

Pre-qualifying classification

Qualifying report
In practice Riccardo Patrese had a huge accident, walking away unhurt. In the qualifying sessions, Patrese took pole position from team-mate Mansell, out-qualifying him for the fifth straight race. Senna was third followed by Prost, Moreno, Berger, Alesi, Piquet, Modena, and Pirro.

Qualifying classification

Race

Race report
At the start, Mansell got away well and led Patrese, Senna, Prost, Berger, and Moreno. Berger went out on lap 4 with electronics problems, while Aguri Suzuki retired when his Lola caught fire. Moreno was out on lap 10 when he spun off, while Prost was suffering from gearbox problems. The Frenchman had managed to hold on while he engaged in a battle with teammate Alesi and Piquet's Benetton.

Mansell led Patrese and Senna on lap 25 when Senna retired, leaving Mansell and Patrese a long way ahead of the Alesi–Prost–Piquet battle. This ended Senna's thus far perfect season, capping his winning streak at 4. Prost retired shortly after with a gearbox failure on lap 27 and Ferrari's misery was compounded on lap 34 when Alesi's engine blew up.

The Williams drivers were now well ahead of the pack, but Piquet closed on Patrese, the Italian suffering from gearbox troubles of his own. In the late stages Patrese was passed by Stefano Modena in the Tyrrell. On the last lap, Mansell led from Piquet, Modena, Patrese, de Cesaris, and Gachot when he suddenly slowed to a halt at the hairpin. There were rumours that Mansell had failed to change gear for the hairpin and stalled the car, or that he had turned off the engine accidentally while waving to the crowd during the final lap. Mansell denied this, saying that the gearbox had gone into neutral as he shifted down, and Williams said that the car had suffered an electrical failure. This is technically true, but was induced by Mansell failing to keep the revs sufficiently high on the engine to drive the electrical and hydraulic systems, thus causing the gearbox barrel to get stuck. When the car was returned to the pits, the engine was re-fired and the gearbox worked perfectly. Piquet thus took an unexpected victory for Benetton at the expense of his old rival Mansell, who was classified sixth. Jordan's five points, their first in Formula One, meant that they would no longer have to pre-qualify when the draw was reshuffled at the halfway point of the season.

The race was Nelson Piquet's 23rd and last win in Formula One, and Stefano Modena's second and last podium finish.

Race classification

Championship standings after the race

Drivers'  Championship standings

Constructors' Championship standings

References

Canadian Grand Prix
Canadian Grand Prix
Grand Prix
Grand Prix